The Yun surname is a Chinese Surname, and is one of the earliest surnames in China.

See also 
 Eight Great Surnames of Chinese Antiquity

References 

Eight Great Surnames of Chinese Antiquity
Chinese-language surnames
Articles containing Korean-language text
Articles containing Vietnamese-language text

Eight surnames of Zhurong